Lorenzo Fernando Lamas (born January 20, 1958) is an American actor. He is widely known for his role of Lance Cumson, the irresponsible grandson of Angela Channing—played by Jane Wyman—in the soap opera Falcon Crest (1981–1990), for which he received a Golden Globe Award nomination for Best Supporting Actor – Series, Miniseries or Television Film.

Lamas is also known for his roles as Reno Raines in the crime drama series Renegade (1992–1997), Dr. Hollywood on the Nickelodeon TV show Big Time Rush (2009-2013), Hector Ramirez in the soap opera The Bold and the Beautiful (2004–2006), and Meap on the television show Phineas and Ferb.

He served as a judge on ABC television's Are You Hot?, and starred in his own reality show, Leave It to Lamas, a series about his real-life family.

Early life
Lamas was born in Santa Monica, California, the son of Argentine actor Fernando Lamas and Norwegian American actress Arlene Dahl. He is the stepson of swimmer and film star Esther Williams, who married his father when Lamas was 11 years old. Both Williams and Dahl were best friends of actress Jane Wyman (who knew him from birth), and would later work alongside Lamas on Falcon Crest. He was brought up in Pacific Palisades, California, and moved to New York City in 1971. In 1979, he took up Taekwondo, earning a third-degree black belt, also Shotokan Karate, Ju jitsu and Aikido, earning black belts in each. He graduated from the Admiral Farragut Academy in Pine Beach, New Jersey, in 1975.

Career

Early career
Lamas had longed to be in show business since the age of five, when he approached his mother and said, "I want to be a star...I mean, an actor." With a smile, she replied, "I heard you the first time, son."

Lamas first studied acting in Tony Barr's Film Actors Workshop and quickly thereafter obtained his first TV acting role in 1976. As a last-minute replacement for Steven Ford, Lamas secured a non-speaking role as a jock in the 1978 musical film Grease, in which he dyed his hair blond. In the late 1970s and early 1980s, Lamas had guest-starring roles in a number of TV series including Switch, Sword of Justice, Dear Detective, Secrets of Midland Heights, Fantasy Island, The Love Boat and Hotel.

Falcon Crest (1981–1990)
In 1980, Lamas auditioned for and won the role of Lance Cumson, for the pilot of a new series entitled The Vintage Years. The pilot was later retooled to become the hit prime time drama series Falcon Crest, which aired on CBS for nine seasons from December 4, 1981, to May 17, 1990. During a 2006 TV interview with a Norwegian television team, Lamas said that to get the role he had auditioned twice and beat out five other actors for the part. Lamas was nominated for a Golden Globe and two Soap Opera Digest Awards for his work on the series; he was the only actor to appear in all 227 episodes.

During his tenure on the show, Lamas had the lead role in the poorly received film Body Rock (1984), where he was nominated for a Golden Raspberry Award for Worst Actor. He also performed a song on the film's soundtrack, and the track "Fools Like Me" became his only single to date to crack the Billboard Hot 100 chart, peaking at #85. The co-founder of the Golden Raspberry Awards, John J.B. Wilson, later named Body Rock as one of "The 100 Most Enjoyably Bad Movies Ever Made".

Later career
Lamas began carving out a niche for himself as an action-hero, showcasing his martial-arts skills by starring in such movies as the Snake Eater-trilogy (1989–1992), Bounty Tracker (1993), Gladiator Cop (1995), Terminal Justice (1996), and many similar low-budget action-films. From 1992 to 1997, Lamas played the lead role of Reno Raines (a falsely accused cop) in the syndicated series Renegade, which allowed him to exercise his enthusiasm for Harley-Davidson motorcycles as well as martial arts. The show was seen in over 100 countries, and during its fifth and final season, it moved from first-run syndication to the USA Network. Lamas had been keeping his hair long (past his shoulders) during this time, so when he had it cut short following the end of the fourth season of Renegade, he had to wear a long-haired wig for filming of the final season. In 2004, Lamas joined the soap opera The Bold and the Beautiful as Hector Ramirez, remaining on the show until 2006. 

In August 2007, Lamas starred as the King of Siam in The King and I at the Ogunquit Playhouse in Ogunquit, Maine. That fall, he performed at Kean University Premiere Stages in Union, New Jersey, in the title role in Steven Dietz's Dracula. In June 2008, he performed as El Gallo in The Fantasticks at the Casa Mañana Theatre in Fort Worth, Texas. In June 2009, Lamas returned to the Ogunquit Playhouse as Zach in A Chorus Line. 

In 2015, Lamas was a cast member of the reality TV series Celebrity Apprentice. 

As of 2016, Lamas was working as a helicopter pilot, flying people on day trips to the Grand Canyon from Los Angeles. According to his Twitter account, he is currently flying as a helicopter tour pilot with HeliNY in New York City.

Personal life
Lamas has been married five times and has six children. His first marriage was to Victoria Hilbert (1981–1982). His second marriage (1983–1985) was to his publicist, Michele Cathy Smith, with whom he had two children: son Alvaro Joshua "A.J." (b. 1983) and daughter Shayne (b. 1985), both actors. Lamas was then in a relationship with actress Daphne Ashbrook; the couple had a daughter, Paton Lee (b. 1988). She likewise is an actress.

Lamas was married to his third wife, Renegade co-star Kathleen Kinmont, from 1989 to 1993. Playmate of the Month Shauna Sand (who made guest appearances in Renegade) became Lamas' fourth wife in 1996. The couple had three daughters—Alexandra Lynne (b. 1997), Victoria (b. 1999), and Isabella Lorenza (b. 2001)—before divorcing in 2002.

After five months of dating, Lamas married his fifth wife, Shawna Craig, 2011 in Cabo San Lucas, Mexico. He told reporters that he would change his name to Lorenzo Lamas-Craig. This decision was motivated by the fact that his previous wife, Shauna, kept the surname Lamas, and is legally named Shauna Lamas, and new bride Shawna, whose given name is a homonym and almost identical to that of Shauna, did not wish to have a virtually identical full name. In June 2018, Lamas filed for divorce from his fifth wife citing irreconcilable differences.

Lamas started dating a woman named Kenna Scott in April 2020. The couple got engaged in Las Vegas in February 2021. The wedding was set to take place in Napa Valley in May 2022.

Lamas enjoyed close friendships with his Falcon Crest co-stars Ana Alicia and Jane Wyman. He continually praised
Wyman's professionalism and credited her as a "huge influence" on his life and career. After Wyman's death in 2007, Lamas released a statement: "Next to my parents, Jane was the most influential person in my young career. She has left an incredible body of work and accomplishments that cannot go without being recognized and celebrated. I will miss her greatly."

Lamas' stepmother, Esther Williams, died on June 6, 2013, at the age of 91, in Los Angeles, California. He stated on Twitter: "The best swim teacher and soul mom RIP."

Lamas published his autobiography, Renegade at Heart (co-written by celebrity biographer Jeff Lenburg) in December 2014.

Filmography

Films

Television

Discography

References

External links
 
 
 Lorenzo Lamas on Discogs: http://www.discogs.com/artist/1679683-Lorenzo-Lamas

1958 births
Living people
Admiral Farragut Academy alumni
American male film actors
American male soap opera actors
American male taekwondo practitioners
American male television actors
American people of Argentine descent
American people of Norwegian descent
Helicopter pilots
Hispanic and Latino American male actors
Male actors from New York City
Male actors from Santa Monica, California
20th-century American male actors
21st-century American male actors
Participants in American reality television series
The Apprentice (franchise) contestants
Bailando por un Sueño (Argentine TV series) participants